Conor Geraroid Hourihane (born 2 February 1991) is an Irish professional footballer who plays as a central midfielder for Derby County and the Republic of Ireland national team.

His previous clubs include Aston Villa, Barnsley, Plymouth Argyle, Sunderland and Ipswich Town. He also played on loan for Swansea City and Sheffield United.

He has represented the Republic of Ireland senior side at international level as well as under-19 and under-21 levels.

Club career

Early career
Hourihane came through the youth team of Sunderland and stayed with the Black Cats until 2010 when his contract expired. He was offered a new deal by Sunderland but chose to sign for his idol Roy Keane's Football League Championship side Ipswich Town, who had to offer compensation for the deal. Hourihane failed to make an appearance for Ipswich in the 2010–11 season.

Plymouth Argyle
He signed for Football League Two side Plymouth Argyle on 30 July 2011 on a free transfer after being released by Ipswich and impressing on trial. He made his professional debut on 6 August 2011, in the opening day draw with Shrewsbury Town at the New Meadow. On 15 October, Hourihane scored his first goal for Plymouth in a 3–2 win over Dagenham & Redbridge. He became the club's captain during the 2012–13 season following the departure of Darren Purse to Port Vale and signed a new two-year contract in May 2013. Hourihane impressed for Plymouth in the 2013–14 season, starting 53 games and missing only one match all season because of suspension, scoring nine goals in the process.

Barnsley
Hourihane joined Barnsley on 23 June 2014 for a fee of £250,000, signing a three-year contract with the Tykes. He earned the League One Player of the Month award for August 2014, after making an impressive start to his Barnsley career. Hourihane became captain of the club in December 2015.

Hourihane and his teammates won two trophies at Wembley Stadium in London, during the 2015–2016 season: The first visit to Wembley was on 3 April 2016 for the Football League Trophy, in which Barnsley won 3–2 in the League Trophy final, after beating Oxford United of League Two. The second visit to Wembley was on 29 May 2016, for the Football League One play-offs final. Barnsley won promotion to the Championship, after beating Millwall 3–1 in the Play-off final.

Hourihane and Barnsley had a highly successful start to life in the Championship, winning five out of their first seven games, including 4–0 wins against Rotherham and Wolverhampton Wanderers, and with Hourihane scoring three goals in these first seven games and assisting a further five. He went on to win the Championship Player of the Month for August 2016.

Despite speculation linking Hourihane with Aston Villa on 21 January 2017, Hourihane captained Barnsley to a 3–2 victory against Leeds United with Hourihane scoring the match winning goal with a free-kick.

On 26 January 2017, it was confirmed that Hourihane had left Barnsley to sign for Championship rivals Aston Villa for an undisclosed fee. Both Hourihane and Barnsley released a statement, the player thanking the fans and commenting that Barnsley "will always have a special place in my heart".

Aston Villa
On 26 January 2017, Hourihane joined Aston Villa on three-and-a-half-year deal. Hourihane made 17 appearances as Villa finished the season in 13th place, scoring his first Villa goal against Bristol City in February. He scored his first hat trick for the club in a 4–2 victory at home against Norwich City in August 2017.

Hourihane signed a new three-year deal in the summer of 2019 as a reward for helping the side win promotion to the Premier League. On 5 October 2019, he scored his first Premier League goal in a 5–1 away victory over Norwich City –  which meant that he had scored in all four levels of the English football league system.

On 20 January 2021, Hourihane joined Championship side Swansea City on loan for the remainder of the 2020–21 season. On 23 January 2021, Hourihane made his Swansea debut, in a 5–1 FA Cup victory over Nottingham Forest with a performance that was described as "excellent" by Swansea manager Steve Cooper. In his second appearance, and his league debut, he scored his first goal for the club in a 1–1 draw with Brentford on 27 January 2021.

On 30 August 2021, Hourihane joined Championship side Sheffield United on loan for the 2021–22 season.

On 10 June 2022, Hourihane was released by Aston Villa at the end of his contract.

Derby County
On 6 July 2022, Hourihane joined recently relegated League One club Derby County on a two-year deal.

International career
On 28 March 2017, Hourihane made his senior international debut, starting in a 1–0 friendly defeat against Iceland at the Aviva Stadium. Hourihane won his second cap in a friendly against Mexico on 2 June 2017. On 26 March 2019, Hourihane scored his first senior international goal in a 1–0 win over Georgia at the Aviva Stadium. The Republic of Ireland's first home match in Euro 2020 qualifying received additional coverage due to a protest against the former CEO of the Football Association of Ireland (FAI), John Delaney. A portion of the Republic of Ireland supporters threw tennis balls on the pitch during the 33rd minute to express their discontent at Delaney remaining part of the FAI hierarchy.

Personal life
Hourihane is the second cousin of Republic of Ireland goalkeeper Marie Hourihan.

Career statistics

Club

International

Scores and results list the Republic of Ireland's goal tally first, score column indicates score after each Hourihane goal.

Honours
Barnsley
Football League Trophy: 2015–16
Football League One play-offs: 2016

Aston Villa
EFL Championship play-offs: 2019
EFL Cup runner-up: 2019–20

Individual
Football League One Player of the Month: August 2014
Barnsley Player of the Year: 2014–15
EFL Championship Player of the Month: September 2016

References

External links

1991 births
Living people
Association footballers from County Cork
Republic of Ireland association footballers
Republic of Ireland youth international footballers
Republic of Ireland under-21 international footballers
Association football midfielders
Sunderland A.F.C. players
Ipswich Town F.C. players
Plymouth Argyle F.C. players
Barnsley F.C. players
Aston Villa F.C. players
Swansea City A.F.C. players
Sheffield United F.C. players
Derby County F.C. players
English Football League players
Republic of Ireland international footballers
Premier League players